Appreciation Day is the sixth studio album by American recording artist Jaheim. The album was released on September 3, 2013.

Critical response

Appreciation Day was met with a generally positive reviews from music critics. Andy Kellman of AllMusic gave the album three and a half stars out of five, saying "When Jaheim announced his first album in three years, which followed five straight Top Five R&B albums, he said, "I decided to call the project Appreciation Day because that’s exactly what this album is…my show of appreciation to them." He was speaking about his fans, but the album's title track refers to women—more specifically, a specific part of female anatomy that he likens to a breakfast pastry. He projects like a gospel sermon: "For the feel of it, the scent of it, the taste, I lit a candle on top of the case." Jaheim's boldness is at an all-time high, but there's a lot of relatively—relatively—tame romantic matter, such as the Shirley Murdock-sampling "Morning" and the apologetic "Baby X3." "Age Ain't a Factor" is a woman-honoring highlight, but Jaheim can't help but sneak in some humor ("Ladies, it's Thanksgiving, and I'm about to eat that stuffing") and deliver it like it's an ordinary line."

Commercial performance
The album debuted at number 6 on the US Billboard 200 chart, with first-week sales of 58,000 copies in the United States. The album has sold 175,000 copies in the US as of February 2016.

Track listing

Sample credits
 "Age Ain't a Factor" contains interpolations from the composition "Groove with Me" as performed by The Isley Brothers.
 "Impossible" contains elements of "As We Lay" as performed by Shirley Murdock.
 "Blame Me" contains elements of "It Was a Very Good Year" as performed by Frank Sinatra.

Charts

Weekly charts

Year-end charts

References

Jaheim albums
Atlantic Records albums
2013 albums